Jonathan Rosenbaum (born February 27, 1943) is an American film critic and author. Rosenbaum was the head film critic for The Chicago Reader from 1987 to 2008, when he retired. He has published and edited numerous books about cinema and has contributed to such notable film publications as Cahiers du cinéma and Film Comment.

Regarding Rosenbaum, French New Wave director Jean-Luc Godard said, "I think there is a very good film critic in the United States today, a successor of James Agee, and that is Jonathan Rosenbaum. He's one of the best; we don't have writers like him in France today. He's like André Bazin."

Early life
Rosenbaum grew up in Florence, Alabama, where his grandfather had owned a small chain of movie theaters. He grew up with his father Stanley and mother Mildred in the Rosenbaum House, designed by notable architect Frank Lloyd Wright, the only building by Wright in Alabama. As a teenager, he attended The Putney School in Putney, Vermont, where his classmates included actor Wallace Shawn. He graduated from Putney in 1961.

Rosenbaum developed a lifelong interest in jazz as a teenager. He frequently refers to it in his film criticism. He attended Bard College, where he played piano in an amateur jazz ensemble that included future actors Chevy Chase as a drummer and Blythe Danner as a vocalist. He studied literature at Bard with the intention of becoming a writer. Among his professors was German philosopher Heinrich Blücher, whose teaching had a strong effect on Rosenbaum.

Earliest career
After graduate school, he moved to New York and was hired to edit a collection of film criticism, which marked his first foray into the field.

Rosenbaum moved to Paris in 1969, working briefly as an assistant to director Jacques Tati and appearing as an extra in Robert Bresson's Four Nights of a Dreamer. While living there, he began writing film and literary criticism for The Village Voice, based in the Village in New York City, Film Comment, and Sight & Sound. In 1974, he moved from Paris to London, where he remained until March 1977, when he was offered a two-semester teaching position at the University of California, San Diego by Manny Farber. Farber had a major influence on Rosenbaum's criticism, but the two men had never met until the latter arrived in San Diego.<ref name="Farber

Career
Rosenbaum was chosen to succeed Dave Kehr as the main film critic for The Chicago Reader; he served in that position until 2008.

In addition, he has written many books on film and its criticism, including Film: The Front Line 1983 (1983), Placing Movies: The Practice of Film Criticism (1995), Moving Places: A Life at the Movies (1980; reprint 1995), Movies as Politics (1997), and Essential Cinema (2004).

His most popular work is Movie Wars: How Hollywood and the Media Limit What Movies We Can See (2002). He has written the best-known analysis of Jim Jarmusch's film Dead Man; the book includes recorded interviews with Jarmusch.  The book places the film in the acid western subgenre.

He edited This Is Orson Welles (1992), by Welles and Peter Bogdanovich, a collection of interviews and other materials relating to Welles. Rosenbaum consulted on both the 1998 re-editing of Welles's Touch of Evil (which was based on a lengthy memo written by Welles to Universal Pictures in the 1950s) and the 2018 completion of Welles's The Other Side of the Wind.

In August 2007, Rosenbaum marked the passing of Swedish director Ingmar Bergman with an op-ed piece in The New York Times, titled "Scenes from an Overrated Career."

He is a frequent contributor to the DVD Beaver website, where he offers his alternative lists of genre films. He also writes the Global Discovery Column in the film journal Cinema Scope, where he reviews international DVD releases of films that are not widely available. He also writes a column called En Movimiento for the Spanish magazine Caimán Cuadernos De Cine.

Rosenbaum was a visiting professor of film at Virginia Commonwealth University's art history department in Richmond, Virginia from 2010 to 2011. From 2013 to 2015, he taught four times as a visiting lecturer at Bela Tarr's Film.Factory in Sarajevo, Bosnia.

Rosenbaum participated in the 2012 Sight & Sound critics' poll; he responded with these films as the ten best ever made: Vampir-Cuadecuc, Greed, Histoire(s) du cinéma, I Was Born, But..., Ivan, Rear Window, Sátántangó, Spione, The Wind Will Carry Us, and The World. He chose films other than those he had previously chosen for earlier Sight and Sound top ten lists.

Rosenbaum appears in the 2009 documentary For the Love of Movies: The Story of American Film Criticism, where he discusses the film criticism of Manny Farber.

He has said that his three favorite narrative films are Day of Wrath, Ordet and Gertrud, all directed by Carl Theodor Dreyer, the order depending, "almost entirely on which one I’ve seen most recently".

Alternative Top 100

In response to the AFI list of 100 greatest American movies published in 1998, Rosenbaum published his own list, focusing on less well-established, more diverse films. It also includes works by important independent American directors (such as John Cassavetes and Jim Jarmusch) who were absent from the AFI list. A second list by the AFI incorporated five titles from Rosenbaum's list.

In Essential Cinema: On the Necessity of Film Canons (2004), he appended a more general list of his 1,000 favorite films from all nations; slightly more than half were American. He starred his 100 favorite films on the list, marking both traditionally canonical films such as Greed (silent -) and Citizen Kane, and harder-to-find films such as Michael Snow's La Région Centrale and Jacques Rivette's Out 1.

Best films of the year
Rosenbaum has compiled "best of the year" movie lists from 1972 to 1976, and from 1987 to 2022, thereby helping provide an overview of his critical preferences.

His top choices were:

Bibliography
As authorMoving Places: A Life in the Movies (1980–1995)  Midnight Movies (1983–1991) (with J. Hoberman) Film: The Front Line 1983 (1983) Greed (1993) Placing Movies: The Practice of Film Criticism (1995) Movies as Politics (1997) Dead Man (2000) Movie Wars: How Hollywood and the Media Limit What Films You See A Capella/Chicago Review Press (2000) Abbas Kiarostami (Contemporary Film Directors) (2003–2018) (with Mehrnaz Saeed-Vafa) Essential Cinema: On the Necessity of Film Canons (2004) Discovering Orson Welles  (2007) The Unquiet American: Transgressive Comedies from the U.S. (2009) Goodbye Cinema, Hello Cinephilia: Film Culture in Transition (2010) Cinematic Encounters: Interviews and Dialogues (2018) Cinematic Encounters 2: Portraits and Polemics (2019) 

As editorThis is Orson Welles (1992–1998) Movie Mutations: The Changing Face of World Cinephilia (2003) (with Adrian Martin) 

 References 

 External links 
 Jonathan Rosenbaum Official Site
 Chicago Reader: Jonathan Rosenbaum bibliography
 Jonathan Rosenbaum's 1000 Essential Films
 Interview with Rosenbaum on Orson Welles
 CineScene interview
 Interview with: Jonathan Rosenbaum on The Oxford American
 2007 video interview - Unseen Orson Welles - a Conversation With Jonathan Rosenbaum
 A conversation with Jonathan Rosenbaum on The Marketplace of Ideas''

1943 births
20th-century American male writers
20th-century American non-fiction writers
21st-century American male writers
21st-century American non-fiction writers
American expatriates in England
American expatriates in France
American film critics
National Society of Film Critics Members
Bard College alumni
Chicago Reader people
Living people
People from Florence, Alabama
The Putney School alumni
University of California, San Diego faculty
Writers from Alabama